The Providence LDS Chapel and Meetinghouse is a historic building in Providence, Utah. It was built in 1869–1873, before Utah became a state, as a chapel and meetinghouse for the Church of Jesus Christ of Latter-day Saints. It was designed in the Greek Revival style by James H. Brown. The roof was built by Henry Bullock, Henry Theurer, and William Fife. A two-story extension was built in 1925, and it was designed in the Colonial Revival style. The building remained the property of the LDS Church until 1967. It has been listed on the National Register of Historic Places since February 11, 1982.

References

Meetinghouses of the Church of Jesus Christ of Latter-day Saints in Utah
National Register of Historic Places in Cache County, Utah
Greek Revival architecture in Utah
Colonial Revival architecture in Utah
Buildings and structures completed in 1869
1869 establishments in Utah Territory